Rock Opera is a 1999 comedy film that follows a fictional Austin, Texas musician's attempt to put together a tour for his struggling and under-appreciated band Pigpoke. The movie debuted at South by Southwest 1999.

Plot
Toe (Jerry Don Clark) wants his rock band Pigpoke to go on tour. He raises funds for the tour by selling marijuana, eventually making leaving town a necessity in order to survive.

References

External links
 
 
 

1999 films
American comedy thriller films
Films about drugs
Films shot in Texas
1999 comedy films
1990s English-language films
1990s American films